Jade Alleyne (born 17 March 2001) is a British actress, known for her roles as Clem Burton in the CBBC sitcom 4 O'Clock Club, and Kaylee in the Disney Channel musical drama The Lodge.

Early and personal life
Alleyne was born in 2001 in Aberdeen, Scotland at Aberdeen Royal Infirmary. Alleyne attended Albyn School, but moved to South London when she was accepted into Sylvia Young Theatre School and she studied at a further education college. Alleyne attended multiple performing arts institutes, including HJA Performing Arts in Beckenham and was part of the street dance team, Dance Alive. Her aunt is Sonita Alleyne.

Career
Alleyne joined the cast of the 4 O'Clock Club in the fourth series as Clem Burton. Her casting in Disney's The Lodge was announced in March 2016. Alleyne released her debut single "If You Only Knew" in June 2016, as part of the soundtrack for The Lodge. It was later remixed by Cutmore. In 2019, she recorded the theme song for the Disney Channel animated series Sadie Sparks. Later that year, she portrayed the role of Ruby Bisme-Lyons in the BBC drama Years and Years. In 2020, it was announced that Alleyne would portray the role of Tanit Ward in the Netflix drama White Lines.

Filmography

References

External links
 
 

2001 births
Living people
People educated at Albyn School
21st-century English actresses
21st-century English women singers
21st-century English singers
21st-century Scottish actresses
21st-century Scottish singers
Actresses from Aberdeen
Alumni of the Sylvia Young Theatre School
Black British actresses
British child actresses
British people of Barbadian descent
English child actresses
English child singers
English people of Barbadian descent
Scottish child actresses
Scottish child singers